This list of Elle (Quebec) cover models is a catalog of people who have appeared on the cover of the Quebec edition of Elle magazine.

2013

2014

2015

2016

2017

2018

2019

2020

External links
 Elle Quebec
 Elle Quebec at Models.com

Quebec